The 1688 Smyrna earthquake occurred at 11:45 on 10 July. It had an epicenter close to Izmir, Turkey. It had an estimated magnitude of 7.0 , with a maximum felt intensity of X (Extreme) on the Mercalli intensity scale, and caused about 16,000 casualties.

Aftermath
When the city was rebuilt, houses were mainly built of wood, apart from the foundations and the base of the walls where stone was used. This made the reconstructed buildings more resistant to future earthquakes.

See also
 List of earthquakes in Turkey
 List of historical earthquakes
 2020 Izmir earthquake

References

1688 Smyrna
1688 earthquakes
1688 in the Ottoman Empire
1688
1688 in Asia